Liberty Grove may be:

Places
Australia
Liberty Grove, New South Wales, a suburb in Sydney, Australia

United States
Liberty Grove, Alabama
Liberty Grove, Maryland
Liberty Grove, Tennessee
Liberty Grove, Dallas County, Texas
Liberty Grove, Delta County, Texas
Liberty Grove, Wisconsin, town